Hemicircle may refer to:

 Hemicycle, a semicircular or horseshoe shaped debating chamber
 Semicircle, a geometric shape that forms half of a circle